Caprabo is a leading supermarket company in Spain and Andorra, 
with supermarkets and hypermarkets in Mainland Spain, the Balearic Islands and the Canary Islands, as well as internationally in Andorra. It operates an online shopping and delivery service in Spain.

It has a history of 45 years of trading and has a turnover of 1.671 million euros in 2008.

Caprabo was acquired by Eroski in 2007.

Footnotes

External links
Caprabo Website

Supermarkets of Spain
Spanish brands
Mondragon Corporation